Wellman is an English surname. Notable people with the surname include:

Arthur Holbrook Wellman (1855–1948), Massachusetts state senator
Barry Wellman (born 1942), American-Canadian sociologist
Bela Wellman (1819–1887), California Gold Rush merchant and member of the San Francisco Vigilance Committee
Brad Wellman (born 1959), American baseball player
Dorothy Wellman (1913–2009), American actress and dancer
Frederick Creighton Wellman (1873-1960), American entomologist and physician
Frederick Lovejoy Wellman (1897-1994), American plant pathologist, son of Frederick Creighton Wellman
Gary Wellman (born 1967), American football player
Harold Wellman (1909–1999), New Zealand geologist
Harry R. Wellman (1899–1997), president of the University of California
Ken Wellman (1930–2013), Australian ice hockey player
Mac Wellman (born 1945), American playwright
Manly Wade Wellman (1903–1986), American writer of fiction and non-fiction, son of Frederick Creighton Wellman
Michael Wellman (born 1961), American computer scientist
Mike Wellman (born 1956), American football player
Paul Wellman (1895-1966), American journalist, screenwriter and author, son of Frederick Creighton Wellman
Phillip Wellman (born 1961), American minor league baseball manager
Samuel T. Wellman (1847–1919), American industrialist, steel magnate, and inventor
Thomas Wellman (1615–1672), Puritan colonist of the Massachusetts Bay Colony
Walter Wellman (1858–1934), American journalist, explorer, and aëronaut
William A. Wellman (1896–1975), American film director
William Wellman Jr. (born 1937), American actor

See also
Wellmann